Christopher Paul Stebbings MBE is an actor and the artistic director of TNT Theater Britain (known in Japan as the International Theater Company London) and the American Drama Group Europe.

Background
Stebbings was born in Nottingham and studied drama at Bristol University. He trained in the Grotowski method with Triple Action Theatre in Britain and Poland. Stebbings founded TNT theatre in 1980 and received regular Arts Council funding for work in the UK. He has also acted for Nottingham Playhouse and TNT and directed and written for South Yorkshire Theatre; Paragon Ensemble, Glasgow; Tams Theatre, Munich; the St. Petersburg State comedy Theatre, the Athens Concert Hall, Megaron; and regularly for  Teatro Espressivo in  Costa Rica where his adaptation of Dickens' Christmas Carol "Cuenta de Navidad" is performed each year. Paul is the most prolific foreign director of theatre in China, in both English and Mandarin.  His three productions for the Shanghai Dramatic Arts Centre remain in their regular repertoire: The Taming of the Shrew, Oliver Twist and The Murder of Sherlock Holmes. TNT theatre tours three to four times a year throughout much of China, produced by Beijing-based Milky Way  Paul Stebbings work  in China is featured extensively in Nancy Pellegrini's book The People's Bard  
TNT theatre website: https://www.tnttheatre.com/   
His productions tour in Europe, Asia, Central America and the Middle East. Festival appearances include the award-winning Wizard of Jazz at the Munich Biennale, the Off-Broadway Festival in New York City, and award-winning performances at the Edinburgh Festival of The Murder of Sherlock Holmes, in which he played the title role. Paul recently  (2017) directed Julius Caesar in Schlegel's German translation at the Munich Glyptothek. His new play about the Syrian Civil War and the refugee crisis, My Sister Syria, toured Europe in 2017 and 2018. in 2019 his Spanish version of Lord of the Flies premiered in Costa Rica and toured to Peru. In 2021 he co-wrote the musical FRANKENSTEIN with composer Christian Auer for the Deutsches theater Munich, and that production tours in 2022. His production of OTHELLO tours to 60 European castles  and palaces in 2022 and closes the Royal Jubilee celebrations at Balmoral castle.

Paul Stebbings lives in Munich with his wife, Angelika, a television executive.

Honours
He was appointed Member of the Order of the British Empire (MBE) in the 2013 Birthday Honours for services to promoting British theatre and furthering British cultural interests in Asia.

Productions and publications

TNT The New Theatre - The ideas, adventures and productions of TNT theatre by Paul Stebbings and Phil Smith. Published by Triarchy Press UK 2020. https://www.triarchypress.net/tnt.html 
Macbeth
One Flew Over the Cuckoo's Nest
Brave New World
Moon Palace
Fahrenheit 451
A Midsummer Night's Dream
Hamlet
The Taming of the Shrew
Gulliver's Travels: A Satirical Science-Fiction Adventure
Harlequin (later retitled Glasnost Harlequin)
The Charlie Chaplin Putsch
Twelfth Night
The Life and Death of Martin Luther King
Free Mandela (new play by Paul Stebbings and Phil Smith) 2020
Othello 2020 - 2022
Cuenta de Navidad 2007 - 2022 
  Frankenstein the rock musical 2021 [17]

==External links==
 TNT theatre

References

English male stage actors
English theatre directors
Year of birth missing (living people)
Living people
Actors from Nottingham
Theatre people from Munich
Alumni of the University of Bristol
Male actors from Nottinghamshire
Members of the Order of the British Empire